Mennonite Church may refer to:
 Mennonites, an anabaptist denominational family
 Mennonite Church (1683–2002), a denomination which merged with the General Conference Mennonite Church in 2002
 Mennonite Church Canada (2000—)
 Mennonite Church USA (2002—)